Ni Min-jan (30 April 1946 – April 2005) was a famous well-rounded Taiwanese celebrity and entertainer. TV and movie star. Comedian and recording artist. Cross-talk(Xiangsheng) and play writer.

In 1979, he teamed up with Zhang Kui, Zhang Fei, Ling Feng, and Xia Yunfei to form the "Wenna Five Rats" (named after the Wenna Five Tigers). The group was a sensation in the Taiwan show scene in the 1980s. Ni Min-jan was brilliant at imitating funny, well-known classic characters such as "Mr. Seven" and "Vice President Ni".

The cause of his death was suicide by hanging in April 2005 at age 58 or 59. Ni had been suffering from depression, and was having financial and family problems, including having an affair with Xia Yi.

Ni was friends with singer and television personality Chang Fei and singer Frankie Kao.

See also

 List of comedians
 List of Taiwanese people
 Lists of actors

References

Date of death unknown
Place of birth missing
1946 births
2005 deaths
20th-century Taiwanese male actors
21st-century Taiwanese male actors
Taiwanese male comedians
People from Jinhua
People from Yilan County, Taiwan
Suicides by hanging in Taiwan
Taiwanese comedy
Taiwanese male television actors
Taiwanese people from Zhejiang
20th-century comedians
2005 suicides